Secrets Every Smart Traveler Should Know was a musical comedy revue that opened off-Broadway in 1997. Based on Wendy Perrin's travel book, it depicted the woes of a group of travellers on their worldwide journeys, intercepted by short sketches based around amusing airport announcements, travel company phone-lines and announcements by the "pilot".

The show's European premiere was in Cambridge, UK at the Playroom at Cambridge Arts Theatre, presented by the Cambridge University Musical Theatre Society.

Original Off-Broadway production
Secrets Every Smart Traveler Should Know originally opened off-Broadway at the Triad Theater on October 30, 1997. The original cast included James Darrah, Kathy Fitzgerald, Stan Freeman, Jay Leonhart, Liz McConahay and Michael McGrath. In 1998 the show transferred from the Triad Theater to the Ibis Supper Club where it remained until the end of its run. Overall, it ran for 953 performances before its closing in February 2000.

Synopsis

Act one
Flight Attendant (LIZ) announces the beginning of the show and instructs the audience to "fasten our seatbelts, it's going to be a bumpy night." The CAST sings "I've Got A Secret" introducing the audience to the perils of travel and some savvy tips to avoid the pitfalls.

A distraught Business Traveler (JAMES) appears to be naked except for undershorts, or a towel around his waist. In "Naked in Pittsburgh" he laments the state and whereabouts of his luggage.

Next we see a hip and happy Traveler (MICHAEL) on the phone with an automated reservationist (KATHY). The reservationist guides an increasingly frustrated Traveler through options and automated loops until finally the weary Traveler's time limit expires and he is disconnected.

In "Star Search", an excited passenger (LIZ) sings about the riveting talent in the cruise ship talent show.

Then JAY details the unusual items he's managed to pick up from his travels. In "Customs", he can't understand why officials are giving him such a hard time.

A Car-Renter (MICHAEL) laments his exorbitant car rental bill with a sexy Hertz Reservations Clerk (LIZ) in "Hertz".

A tourist (KATHY) in "Acapulco" sings about the stunning and handsome souvenirs she brought back from her vacation.

Then, in the high style of a Noël Coward play, Amanda (LIZ) and Elyot (JAMES), two ex-spouses, are horrified to find out that they share adjoining balconies with each other on their current honeymoons. As a faint piano plays strains of "Someday I'll Find You", Amanda and Elyot reminisce about the past and talk of their current loves.

Next, MICHAEL and KATHY are dressed to resemble the husband and wife in the Grant Wood painting, American Gothic. They sing about the joys and challenges of "Seeing America First."

JAMES tries to remember what he left behind in "What Did I Forget?"

In "Reservations: Part 2" our hip and anxious traveller (MICHAEL) tries another go with the automated reservationist (KATHY). He ends up holding for the next available operator.

A French Chanteuse (LIZ) sings about her lover and his little idiosyncrasies in "The French Song" while (KATHY) translates.

An elegant Gambler (MICHAEL), a loud housewife (KATHY), a kid with a lollipop (LIZ), and an old man with a cane(JAMES) sing about their favorite part of cruise-ship life in "Buffet".

Act two
The CAST encourages the audience to see the wonders of the world before it all comes crumbling down in "See It Now."

Then we see MICHAEL asleep near the phone as Canned Music plays in the background. The automated receptionist asks him to continue to hold and asserts that his call is important.

A sad and forlorn country and western girl (LIZ) sings an ode to "Mr. Trailways" and tells of her illicit love gone wrong in "Please Mr. Trailways."

Carmen Miranda (KATHY) and two jungle-outfitted men sing about their tropical island and its pressing problem in "Red Hot Lava".

STAN sings about the love he feels for his special island, Uzbekistan in "Paradise Found".

A tourist (LIZ) has a run-in with a fierce-looking Border Guard on her first vacation in years.

In "Me and Margarita" JAY laments the unhappy situation of bringing back more than he gastronomically bargained for on his nine-day eating and drinking spree in Mexico.

After a brief message from the captain of an Air India flight, a member of the CAST sets a candelabra on the piano. The rest of the CAST follow her and gather around the piano to sing "Salzburg"; a bright number extolling the virtues and vices of Mozart and his festival in Salzburg.

MICHAEL awakes as Sharon (KATHY), a real, live operator finally answers the phone. Sharon (KATHY) flirts with MICHAEL as she suggestively takes his details for his flight to Nome, Alaska. She has almost completed the reservation when she begins to repeat herself over and over and MICHAEL is unsure of whether she was a real person or not.

JAMES sings about the joys of flying in "Aging Planes".

A shy and unassuming man with a lisp (MICHAEL) sings about his perfect match; a woman he met on his vacation to Spain in "She Spoke Spanish".

LIZ gives us another travel secret. This one is about finding the best travel agent. Then three savvy, high-powered travel agents (JAMES, MICHAEL, and KATHY) all compete for the best deals for their customers in "Honey, Sweetie, Baby".

The CAST reminds us of the importance to "See it Now" (Reprise) before the wonders of the world disappear.

As the CAST finishes their bows they sing about their favorite place toward which to travel, "Home".

Song list

Act one
 Secrets Every Smart Traveler Should Know
 Travel Secret #1
 Naked In Pittsburgh
 Reservations #1
 Star Search
 Customs
 Hertz
 This Is Your Captain Speaking #1
 Acapulco
 Private Wives
 Seeing America First
 What Did I Forget?
 Reservations #2
 The French Song
 Buffet

Act two
 See It Now
 Reservations #3
 This Is Your Captain Speaking #2
 Please, Mr. Trailways, Take Me Away
 This Is Your Captain Speaking #3
 Red Hot Lava
 Travel Secret #109
 Paradise
 Border Guard
 Me And Margherita
 This Is Your Captain Speaking #4
 Salzburg
 Reservations #4
 Aging Planes
 She Spoke Spanish
 Honey, Sweetie, Baby
 This Is Your Captain Speaking #5
 See It Now
 Home

Cast recording
A cast recording was released on June 1, 1999, under the RCA Victor label. It featured the cast that transferred originally to the Ibis Supper Club theater including the vocal talents of Charles Alterman, Ray DeMattis, Maribeth Graham, Jay Leonhart, Nick Santa Maria and Denise Nolin.

References

1999 musicals
Comedy plays
Revues
Off-Broadway musicals